Aimée de Heeren, born Aimée Soto-Maior de Sá or Aimée de Sotomayor (3 August 1903 – 13 September 2006) was a Brazilian socialite and secret service agent tasked with keeping Getúlio Vargas away from a WW2 alliance with Nazi Germany. She was named to the International Best Dressed Hall of Fame List in 1996.

She was the sister of Vera de Sá Sottomaior, who was married to John Felix Charles "Ivor" Bryce, Randal Plunkett, 19th Baron of Dunsany and Sir Walter Frederic Pretyman. Through her sister, she is the aunt of the 20th Baron of Dunsany.

Early years
Aimée de Heeren was born in Castro, Paraná. She was the daughter of schoolteacher Genésio de Sá Sotomayor and Julieta Sampaio Quentel.

In the late 1920s, she met American inventor Thomas Edison.

Rio de Janeiro

In the 1930s, she moved to Rio de Janeiro, where she married Luís Simões Lopes, chief of staff of President Getúlio Vargas. According to rumors, de Heeren was the mistress of the married President, and lived at the Catete Palace, the seat of the President of Brazil. De Heeren never confirmed nor denied being his mistress.

Decades after Vargas's death in 1954, his secret diary was published with multiple references to his "bem-amada" (English: "beloved"). Some historians believe that the "bem-amada" was Aimée de Heeren.

Secret Service agent in Paris
In 1938, she was sent to France to find information for President Vargas. Vargas was invited to join the Axis powers. 
Disguised as a "fashionista", 
Aimée met many people from society with French, British, and German background. Among them was the German lawyer and Nazi oppositionist Helmuth James Graf von Moltke, who gave her confidential information about Germany. 
With this information, she influenced President Vargas away from an alliance with the Axis.

De Heeren was also seen with Coco Chanel at many receptions, including the two Circus Bal events given by Elsie de Wolfe. Chanel and de Heeren remained close friends, particularly towards the end of Chanel's life.

According to the US Vogue editor Bettina Ballard, de Heeren, at the time called Aimée Lopez or Aimée Lopez de Sotto Major, made a huge impression on French society:

Exile in New York
Due to the Nazi occupation of France, she was forced to emigrate to the U.S., where she met with Joseph P. Kennedy Jr, the oldest of the Kennedy brothers, with whom she had fallen in love while in Europe. Her friendship with the Kennedy family lasted until her death. She later married the Spanish-American Rodman Arturo Heeren, grandson of Antonio Heeren, 1st Count of Heeren, and great-grandson of John Wanamaker, the founder of the Wanamaker Department Stores. They had homes in Paris, New York City, Palm Beach, Florida and Biarritz, but never stayed in one location very long. The couple had one daughter: Cristina Heeren y Sá de Sotomayor, 3rd Countess of Heeren. 

Several times, de Heeren was listed as one of the best dressed women in the world, and a 1941 edition of Time magazine included her in a list of "Ten Best Dressed Women in the World". She was mentioned in magazines such as Vogue.

Receptions
Over the decades she was invited to many high-profile weddings and events of royalty and the political and Hollywood elite, including:
 Wedding of the Shah of Iran to Soraya Esfandiary Bakhtiari (12 February 1951)
 Guest at Carlos de Beistegui's Bal oriental at Palazzo Labia in Venice (3 September 1951)
 The Coronation of Queen Elizabeth II (2 June 1953)
 Wedding of John F. Kennedy and Jacqueline Bouvier (12 September 1953)
 Wedding of Grace Kelly to Rainier III, Prince of Monaco (19 April 1956)
 The presidential inauguration ceremony of John F. Kennedy (20 January 1961)
 Guest at Alexis, Baron de Redé's Bal oriental at Hôtel Lambert (5 December 1969)
 The inauguration ceremony for President Ronald Reagan (20 January 1981)
 Wedding of Charles, Prince of Wales, and Lady Diana Spencer (29 July 1981)

She was also invited to various state receptions in the Élysée Palace by Vincent Auriol, Charles de Gaulle, Claude Pompidou, François Mitterrand and Jacques Chirac, and numerous galas in Paris and Versailles by Alexis, Baron de Redé, including at the Hotel Lambert and the Palace of Versailles.

Later years
She took online courses at the Crèmerie de Paris. This resulted in the creation of the Brazilian White Pages. In 2005, at the age of 102, she traveled to Belgrade to attend the 60th birthday of Crown Prince Alexander of Yugoslavia, at the White Palace. She died the following year, in New York City, at the age of 103.

According to the phone book of Biarritz, until she was aged 102, she swam in the Atlantic daily while in the city.

References

External links

1903 births
2006 deaths
Brazilian centenarians
Brazilian expatriates in France
Brazilian expatriates in the United States
Brazilian socialites
People from Paraná (state)
Women centenarians